The Havana MetroBus, shortened as MB, is a public bus network serving the city of Havana, capital of Cuba. It is the principal public transport network of Cuban capital and is conceived as a surface subway.

Overview

The fleet of MetroBus, formerly known as camellos or camelitos (Spanish for camels and little camels) for their two humps, have been modernized, and now uses large modern articulated buses, such as the Chinese-made Yutong brand, Russian-made LiAZ, or MAZ of Belarus. The stops are usually 800–1,000 metres (2,600–3,300 ft), with frequent buses in peak hours, about every 10 minutes. The network is linked to several suburban rail stations.

Routes
The network consists of 17 main lines, all identified with the letter "P" preceding the number:
P-1: La Rosita - Playa
P-2: Alberro - Vedado
P-3: Alamar - Túnel de Línea
P-4: San Agustín - Playa - Terminal de Trenes
P-5: San Agustín - Centro Habana - Terminal de Trenes
P-6: Reparto Eléctrico - Vedado
P-7: Alberro - Parque de la Fraternidad
P-8: Reparto Eléctrico - Villa Panamericana
P-9: La Palma - CUJAE
P-10: Víbora - Playa
P-11: Alamar - El Capitolio - Vedado
P-12: Santiago de Las Vegas - Aeropuerto - Parque de la Fraternidad
P-13: Santiago de Las Vegas - La Palma - Parque de la Fraternidad
P-14: San Agustín - Parque de la Fraternidad
P-15: Alamar - Guanabacoa - Vedado
P-16: Santiago de Las Vegas - Vedado - Hospital Ameijeiras
P-C: Hospital Naval - Playa (semi-circular coast-to-coast line)

See also
Havana Suburban Railway

References

External links

 Buses in Havana at "EcuRed" website

Metrobus
Havana